The Ajuran Sultanate, also natively referred-to as Ajuuraan, and often simply Ajuran, was a Somali Empire in the Middle Ages in the Horn of Africa that dominated the trade in the northern Indian ocean. They belonged to the Somali Muslim sultanate that ruled over large parts of the Horn of Africa in the Middle Ages. Through a strong centralized administration and an aggressive military stance towards invaders, the Ajuran Empire successfully resisted Trading routes dating from the ancient and early medieval periods of Somali maritime enterprise were strengthened or re-established, and foreign trade and commerce in the coastal provinces flourished with ships sailing to and coming from many kingdoms and empires in East Asia, South Asia, Europe, the Near East, North Africa and East Africa.

The empire left an extensive architectural legacy, being one of the major medieval Somali powers engaged in castle and fortress building. Many of the ruined fortifications dotting the landscapes of southern Somalia today are attributed to the Ajuran Empire's engineers, including a number of the pillar tomb fields, necropolises and ruined cities built in that era. During the Ajuran period, many regions and people in the southern part of the Horn of Africa converted to Islam because of the theocratic nature of the government. The royal family, the House of Garen, expanded its territories and established its hegemonic rule through a skillful combination of warfare, trade linkages and alliances.

In the fifteenth century, for example, the Ajuran Empire was the only hydraulic empire in Africa. As a water dynasty, the Ajuran state monopolized the water resources of the Shebelle and Jubba rivers. Through hydraulic engineering, it constructed many of the limestone wells and cisterns of the state that remain in use today. The rulers developed new systems for agriculture and taxation, which continued to be used in parts of the Horn of Africa as late as the 19th century. The rule of the later Ajuran rulers caused multiple rebellions to break out in the empire, and at the end of the 17th century, the Ajuran state disintegrated into several successor kingdoms and states, the most prominent being the Geledi Sultanate.

Location

The Ajuran Empire's sphere of influence in the Horn of Africa was one of the largest in the region. The empire covered much of southern Somalia and eastern Ethiopia, with its domain extending from Hobyo in the north, to Qelafo in the west, to Kismayo in the south.

Origins and the House of Garen

The House of Garen was the ruling hereditary dynasty of the Ajuran Empire. Its origin lies in the Garen Kingdom that during the 13th century ruled parts of the Somali Region of Ethiopia. With the migration of Somalis from the northern half of the Horn region to the southern half, new cultural and religious orders were introduced that influenced the administrative structure of the dynasty, a system of governance which began to evolve into an Islamic government. Through their genealogical Baraka, which came from the saint Balad (who was known to have come from outside the Garen Kingdom), the Garen rulers claimed supremacy and religious legitimacy over other groups in the Horn of Africa. Balad's ancestors are said to have come from the historical northern region of Barbara.

Etymology
The Ajuran Empire traces its name from the Arabic إيجار/'ijara, which means rent or tax. A name well deserved for the exorbitant tributes paid to the Empire.

It survives as the name of the Ajuran clan today.

Administration

The Ajuran nobility used many of the typical Somali aristocratic and court titles, with the Garen rulers styled Imam. These leaders were the empire's highest authority, and counted multiple Sultans, Emirs, and Kings as clients or vassals. The Garen rulers also had seasonal palaces in Mareeg, Qelafo and Merca, important cities in the Empire were Mogadishu and Barawa. The state religion was Islam, and thus law was based on Sharia.

Imam – Head of the State
Emir – Commander of the armed forces and navy
Na'ibs – Viceroys
Wazirs – tax and revenue collectors
Qadis – Chief Judges

Nomadic citizens and farming communities

Through their control of the region's wells, the Garen rulers effectively held a monopoly over their nomadic subjects as they were the only hydraulic empire in Africa during their reign. Large wells made out of limestone were constructed throughout the state, which attracted Somali and Oromo nomads with their livestock. The centralized regulations of the wells made it easier for the nomads to settle disputes by taking their queries to government officials who would act as mediators. Long distance caravan trade, a long-time practice in the Horn of Africa, continued unchanged in Ajuran times. Today, numerous ruined and abandoned towns throughout the interior of Somalia and the Horn of Africa are evidence of a once-booming inland trade network dating from the medieval period.

With the centralized supervision of the Ajuran, farms in Afgooye, Kismayo and other areas in the Jubba and Shabelle valleys increased their productivity. A system of irrigation ditches known locally as Kelliyo fed directly from the Shebelle and Jubba rivers into the plantations where sorghum, maize, beans, grain and cotton were grown during the gu (Spring in Somali) and xagaa (Summer in Somali) seasons of the Somali calendar. This irrigation system was supported by numerous dikes and dams. To determine the average size of a farm, a land measurement system was also invented with moos, taraab and guldeed being the terms used.

Taxation

The State collected tribute from the farmers in the form of harvested products like durra, sorghum and bun, and from the nomads, cattle, camels and goats. The collecting of tribute was done by a wazir. Luxury goods imported from foreign lands were also presented as gifts to the Garen rulers by the coastal sultans of the state.

A political device that was implemented by the Garen rulers in their realm was a form of ius primae noctis, which enabled them to create marriages that enforced their hegemonic rule over all the important groups of the empire. The rulers would also claim a large portion of the bride's wealth, which at the time was 100 camels.

For trade, the Ajuran Empire minted its own Ajuran currency. It also utilized the Mogadishan currency originally minted by the Sultanate of Mogadishu, which later became incorporated into the Ajuran Empire. Mogadishan coins have been found as far away as the present-day country of the United Arab Emirates in the Middle East.

Urban and maritime centers

The urban centers of Merca, Mogadishu, Barawa, and their respective ports became profitable trade outlets for commodities originating from the interior of the State. The farming communities of the hinterland brought their products to the coastal cities, where they were sold to local merchants who maintained a lucrative foreign commerce with ships sailing to and coming from Arabia, India, Venice, Persia, Egypt, Portugal, and as far away as China. Vasco Da Gama, who passed by Mogadishu in the 15th century, noted that it was a large city with houses of four or five storeys high and big palaces in its centre and many mosques with cylindrical minarets. In the 16th century, Duarte Barbosa noted that many ships from the Kingdom of Cambaya sailed to Mogadishu with cloths and spices for which they in return received gold, wax and ivory. Barbosa also highlighted the abundance of meat, wheat, barley, horses, and fruit on the coastal markets, which generated enormous wealth for the merchants. Mogadishu, the center of a thriving weaving industry known as toob benadir (specialized for the markets in Egypt and Syria), together with Merca and Barawa also served as transit stops for Swahili merchants from Mombasa and Malindi and for the gold trade from Kilwa. Jewish merchants from the Hormuz also brought their Indian textile and fruit to the Somali coast in exchange for grain and wood.

Trading relations were established with Malacca in the 15th century, with cloth, ambergris and porcelain being the main commodities of the trade. In addition, giraffes, zebras and incense were exported to the Ming Empire of China, making Somali merchants leaders in the commerce between Asia and Africa. and influencing the Chinese language on Somali in the process. Hindu merchants from Surat and Southeast African merchants from Pate seeking to bypass both the Portuguese blockade and Omani interference used the Somali ports of Merca and Barawa (which were out of the two powers' jurisdiction) to conduct their trade in safety and without interference.

Economy

The Ajuran Empire relied on agriculture and trade for most of its income. Major agricultural towns were located on the Shebelle and Jubba rivers, including Kismayo and Afgooye. Situated at the junction of some of the busiest medieval trade routes, the Ajuran and its clients were active participants in the East African gold trade, the Silk Road commerce, trade in the Indian Ocean, and commercial enterprise as far as East Asia.

The Ajuran Empire also minted its own Ajuran currency. Many ancient bronze coins inscribed with the names of Ajuran Sultans have been found in the coastal Benadir province, in addition to pieces from Muslim rulers of Southern Arabia and Persia. additionally, Mogadishan coins have been found as far as the United Arab Emirates in the Middle East. Trading routes dating from the ancient and early medieval periods of Somali maritime enterprise were strengthened or re-established, and foreign trade and commerce in the coastal provinces flourished with ships sailing to and coming from a myriad of kingdoms and empires in East Asia, South Asia, Europe, the Near East, North Africa and the Horn of Africa. Through the use of commercial vessels, compasses, multiple port cities, light houses and other technology, the merchants of the Ajuran Empire did brisk business with traders from the following states:

Diplomacy

With their maritime pursuits and history, the Empire established trading and diplomatic ties across the old world, especially in Asia, from being a close ally to the grand power of the Ottomans to having cordial ties to the mighty Ming Dynasty and even having their merchants following the greatest maritime expedition in their history as far as Java and Vietnam.
 
The ruler of the Somali Ajuran Empire sent ambassadors to China to establish diplomatic ties, creating the first ever recorded African community in China and the most notable Somali ambassador in medieval China was Sa'id of Mogadishu who was the first African man to set foot in China in recorded history. In return, Emperor Yongle, the third emperor of the Ming Dynasty (1368–1644), dispatched one of the largest fleets in history to trade with the Somali nation. The fleet, under the leadership of the famed Hui Muslim Zheng He, arrived at Mogadishu while the city was at its peak in economic and social vibrancy. Along with gold, frankincense and fabrics, Zheng brought back the first ever African wildlife to China, which included hippos, giraffes and gazelles.

Major cities

The Ajuran Empire was an influential Somali kingdom that held sway over several cities and towns in central and southern Somalia during the Middle Ages. With the fall of the Sultanate, a number of these settlements continued to prosper, eventually becoming major cities in present-day Somalia. A few of these cities and towns were eventually abandoned or destroyed:

Capitals
Mareeg (initially) (town in the Galguduud region of Somalia)
Qelafo (town in the Somali Region of Ethiopia)
Merca (port city in the Lower Shebelle region of Somalia)

Port cities
Mogadishu (harbor city and current capital of Somalia)
Hobyo (harbor city in the Mudug region of Somalia
Kismayo (port city in the Lower Juba region of Somalia)
Barawa (port town in the Lower Shebelle region of Somalia)
Warsheikh (port town in the Middle Shebelle region of Somalia)

Other cities
Afgooye (town in the Lower Shebelle region of Somalia)
Baidoa (a city in the Bay region of Somalia)
Gondershe (abandoned, but now a popular tourist attraction site)
Hannassa (abandoned)
Ras Bar Balla (abandoned)

Culture

The Ajurans developed a very rich culture with various forms of Somali culture such as architecture, astronomy, festivals, music and art evolving and flourishing during this period. The majority of the inhabitants were ethnic Somali, but there were also Yemeni, Persian, and Turkish minorities. The vast majority of the population adhered to Sunni Islam with a Shia minority (mostly those of Persian descent) . Somali was the most commonly used language of government and social life while Arabic was most prominently used for religious studies.

The Somali martial art Istunka, also known as Dabshid, was born during their reign. An annual tournament is held every year for it in Afgooye. Carving, known in Somali as qoris, was practiced in the coastal cities of the state. Many wealthy urbanites in the medieval period regularly employed the finest wood and marble carvers in Somalia to work on their interiors and houses. The carvings on the mihrabs and pillars of ancient Somali mosques are some of the oldest on the continent, with Masjid Fakhr al-Din being the 7th oldest mosque in Africa. Artistic carving was considered the craft of men similar to how the Somali textile industry was mainly a women's business. Amongst the nomads, carving, especially woodwork, was widespread and could be found on the most basic objects such as spoons, combs and bowls, but it also included more complex structures such as the portable nomadic tent, the aqal.

During its tenure, the Empire left an extensive architectural legacy, being one of the major medieval Somali powers engaged in castle and fortress building. Many of the ruined fortifications dotting the landscapes of southern Somalia today are attributed to the Ajuran Empire's engineers. These structures include a number of pillar tomb fields, necropolises, castles, fortresses and ruined cities built in that era. In the Marca area, various pillar tombs exist, which local tradition holds were built in the 16th century, when the Ajuran Empire's naa'ibs governed the district.

Muslim migration

The late 15th and 17th centuries saw the arrival of Muslim families from Arabia, Persia, India and Spain to the Ajuran realm of territories, the majority of whom settled in the coastal provinces. Some migrated because of the instability in their respective regions, as was the case with the Hadhrami families from the Yemen and the Muslims from Spain fleeing the Inquisition. Others came to conduct business or for religious purposes. Due to their strong tradition in religious learning, the new Muslim communities also enjoyed high status among the Somali ruling elite and commoners.

Colonies and influence

Sofala

Sofala is located on the Sofala Bank in Sofala Province of Mozambique. It was founded by Somali merchants and seafarers. Sofala in Somali literally means "Go dig". This name was given because the area is rich with many natural resources.
 
One of the oldest harbours documented in Southern Africa, medieval Sofala was erected on the edge of a wide estuary formed by the Buzi River (called Rio de Sofala in older maps). By the Somali merchants from Mogadishu established a colony in Mozambique to extract gold from the mines in Sofala.
 
The Somalis strengthened their trading capacity by having, among other things, rivergoing dhows ply the Buzi and Save rivers to ferry the gold extracted in the hinterlands to the coast.

Maldives Islands
The first king of the Maldivian Hilaalee dynasty was proclaimed king in the year 1388 AD. Hilaalee dynasty was a Somali Dynasty. Some historical writing and some folklore reveal that this Dynasty is of Somali descent. It seems they were travellers and traders of Ajuran Empire where they established a colony in the Maldive islands. They settled in Hlhule' in Male' atoll. Some historical documents reveal that Hilali Kalo Hassan dethroned King Uthman Rasgefaan, who reveal the ruling King at that time and outcast him and all his ministers. After his Hilai Kalo Hassan started the Hilai Dynasty. The Hilaalee dynasty was a sub-dynasty of Garen Dynasty.
 
Abd al-Aziz of Mogadishu was a Somali governor of Maldives islands and a famous member of the Hilaalee dynasty.
 
The presence and high position of Abd al-Aziz in this region highlights the close connections between medieval Maldives and the Somali seamen from Mogadishu sailing the Indian Ocean. They supplied Maldivian traders with exotic animals and musk, and contributed to the ethnogenesis of the Maldivian population.
 
In 1346, Abd al-Aziz welcomed Ibn Battuta at his court and entertained him before giving him a barque to continue his journey.

Bale

The most famous Somali scholar of Islam from the Ajuraan period is Sheikh Hussein, who was born in Merca, one of the power jurisdiction and cultural centers of the Ajuran Empire. He is credited with converting the Sidamo people living in the area of what is now the Bale Province, Ethiopia to Islam. He is also credited with establishing the Sultanate of Bale. Despite the Bale Sultanate not being directly under Ajuran rule, the two kingdoms were deeply connected and Bale was heavily influenced by Ajuran.

His tomb lies in the town of Sheikh Hussein in what is the most sacred place in the country for Ethiopian Muslims mostly Oromo Muslims.

Military

The Ajuran State had a standing army with which the Garen imams and the governors ruled and protected their subjects. The bulk of the army consisted of mamluke soldiers, who did not have any loyalties to the traditional Somali clan system, thereby making them more reliable. The soldiers were recruited from the inter-riverine area; other recruits came from the surrounding nomadic region. Arab, Persian and Turkish mercenaries were at times employed as well.

In the early Ajuran period, the army's weapons consisted of traditional Somali weapons such as swords, daggers, spears, battle axe, and bows. The Empire received assistance from its close ally the Ottoman Empire, and with the import of firearms through the Muzzaffar port of Mogadishu, the army began acquiring muskets and cannons. The Ottomans would also remain a key ally during the Ajuran-Portuguese wars. Horses used for military purposes were also raised in the interior, and numerous stone fortifications were erected to provide shelter for the army in the coastal districts. In each province, the soldiers were under the supervision of a military commander known as an emir, and the coastal areas and the Indian ocean trade were protected by a navy.

Ajuran-Portuguese battles 

The European Age of discovery brought Europe's then superpower the Portuguese empire to the coast of East Africa, which enjoyed a flourishing trade with foreign nations. The wealthy southeastern city-states of Kilwa, Mombasa, Malindi, Pate and Lamu were all systematically sacked and plundered by the Portuguese. Tristão da Cunha then set his eyes on Ajuran territory, where the Battle of Barawa was fought. After a long period of engagement, the Portuguese soldiers burned the city and looted it. Fierce resistance by the local populace and soldiers resulted in the failure of the Portuguese to permanently occupy the city, and the inhabitants who had fled to the interior eventually returned and rebuilt the city. After Barawa, Tristão set sail for Mogadishu, the richest city on the East African coast. Word had spread of what had happened in Barawa, and a large troop mobilization took place. Many horsemen, soldiers and battleships in defense positions were guarding the city. Nevertheless, Tristão opted to storm and attempt to conquer the city, although every officer and soldier in his army opposed this, fearing certain defeat if they were to engage their opponents in battle. Tristão heeded their advice and sailed for Socotra instead. After the battle the city of Barawa quickly recovered from the attack.

Over the next several decades Somali-Portuguese tensions remained high and the increased contact between Somali sailors and Ottoman corsairs worried the Portuguese who sent a punitive expedition against Mogadishu under João de Sepúlveda, which was unsuccessful. Ottoman-Somali cooperation against the Portuguese in the Indian Ocean reached a high point in the 1580s when Ajuran clients of the Somali coastal cities began to sympathize with the Arabs and Swahilis under Portuguese rule and sent an envoy to the Turkish corsair Mir Ali Bey for a joint expedition against the Portuguese. He agreed and was joined by a Somali fleet, which began attacking Portuguese colonies in Southeast Africa.

The Somali-Ottoman offensive managed to drive out the Portuguese from several important cities such as Pate, Mombasa and Kilwa. However, the Portuguese governor sent envoys to Portuguese India requesting a large Portuguese fleet. This request was answered and it reversed the previous offensive of the Muslims into one of defense. The Portuguese armada managed to re-take most of the lost cities and began punishing their leaders, but they refrained from attacking Mogadishu, securing the city's autonomy in the Indian Ocean. The Ottoman Empire would remain an economic partner of the Somalis. Throughout the 16th and 17th centuries successive Somali Sultans defied the Portuguese economic monopoly in the Indian Ocean by employing a new coinage which followed the Ottoman pattern, thus proclaiming an attitude of economic independence in regard to the Portuguese.

Ajuran-Oromo battles

In the mid-17th century, the Oromo Nation began expanding from its homeland towards the southern Somali coast at the time when the Ajuran was at the height of its power. The Garen rulers conducted several military expeditions known as the Gaal Madow wars against the Oromo warriors, converting those that were captured to Islam.

Decline and successor states
The Ajuran Empire slowly declined in power at the end of the 17th century, which paved the way for the ascendance of new Somali powers. The most prominent setbacks against the state were the dethronement of the Muzaffar clients in Mogadishu and other coastal cities by the Hawiye Hiraab King, and the defeat of the Silis Kingdom by a former Ajuran general, Ibrahim Adeer, in the interior of the state who then established the Gobroon dynasty.

Taxation and the practice of primae noctis were the main catalysts for the revolts against Ajuran rulers. The loss of port cities and fertile farms meant that much needed sources of revenue were lost to the rebels.

See also

History of Somalia
List of Muslim states and dynasties
List of Sunni dynasties
Isaaq Sultanate

References

Sources cited
 
 

 
States and territories established in the 13th century
States and territories disestablished in the 17th century
Former sultanates in the medieval Horn of Africa
13th-century establishments in Africa
17th-century disestablishments in Africa
Medieval Somalia
Ethiopian noble families
Early Modern history of Somalia
Former empires